Josef Grünbeck (September 17, 1925 – October 15, 2012) was a German politician of the Free Democratic Party (FDP) and former member of the German Bundestag.

Life 
1978 to 1982 and in 1990/91 member of the Bavarian State Parliament and in 1990/91 Chairman of the FDP parliamentary group. He was a member of the Bundestag from 1983 to 1994.

Literature

References

1925 births
2012 deaths
Members of the Bundestag for Bavaria
Members of the Bundestag 1990–1994
Members of the Bundestag 1987–1990
Members of the Bundestag 1983–1987
Members of the Bundestag for the Free Democratic Party (Germany)
Members of the Landtag of Bavaria